The Feather River Mudcats were a minor league baseball team located in Marysville, California.  The team played in the independent Western Baseball League, and was not affiliated with any Major League Baseball team.  Their home stadium was Bryant Field.

The Mudcats were founded in 2000 and played only two seasons before ceasing operations after the 2001 season.  They were replaced in 2002 by the Yuba-Sutter Gold Sox, which played until the league folded after the season.

Western Baseball League teams
Defunct baseball teams in California
Sports in Yuba County, California
Defunct independent baseball league teams
Baseball teams disestablished in 2001
Baseball teams established in 2000